In mathematics, a coefficient is a multiplicative factor in some term of a polynomial, a series, or an expression; it is usually a number, but may be any expression (including variables such as ,  and ). When the coefficients are themselves variables, they may also be called parameters.  

The  (or constant term) is the coefficient not attached to variables in an expression. For example, the constant coefficients of the expressions above are the number 3 and the parameter c, respectively. 
The coefficient attached to the highest degree of the variable in a polynomial is referred to as the leading coefficient. For example, in the expressions above, the leading coefficients are 2 and a, respectively.

In the context of differential equations, an equation can often be written as equating to zero a polynomial in the unknown functions and their derivatives. In this case, the coefficients of the differential equation are the coefficients of this polynomial, and are generally non-constant functions. A coefficient is a constant coefficient when it is a constant function. For avoiding confusion, the coefficient that is not attached to unknown functions and their derivative is generally called the constant term rather the constant coefficient. In particular, in a linear differential equation with constant coefficient, the constant term is generally not supposed to be a constant function.

Terminology and definition 
In mathematics, a coefficient is a multiplicative factor in some term of a polynomial, a series, or any expression.  For example, in the polynomial

The third term 1.5 is the constant coefficient. In the final term, the coefficient is 1 and is not explicitly written.

In many scenarios, coefficients are numbers (as is the case for each term of the previous example), although they could be parameters of the problem—or any expression in these parameters. In such a case, one must clearly distinguish between symbols representing variables and symbols representing parameters. For example, if  is considered a parameter in the above expression, then the coefficient of  would be , and the constant coefficient (with respect to ) would be .

When one writes 

Any polynomial in a single variable  can be written as

for some nonnegative integer , where  are the coefficients. For the largest  such that  (if any),  is called the leading coefficient of the polynomial. For example, the leading coefficient of the polynomial

is 4. This can be generalised to multivariate polynomials with respect to a monomial order, see .

Linear algebra
In linear algebra, a system of linear equations is frequently represented by its coefficient matrix.  For example, the system of equations

the associated coefficient matrix is   Coefficient matrices are used in algorithms such as Gaussian elimination and Cramer's rule to find solutions to the system.

The leading entry (sometimes leading coefficient) of a row in a matrix is the first nonzero entry in that row. So, for example, in the matrix

the leading coefficient of the first row is 1; that of the second row is 2; that of the third row is 4, while the last row does not have a leading coefficient.

Though coefficients are frequently viewed as constants in elementary algebra, they can also be viewed as variables as the context broadens. For example, the coordinates  of a vector  in a vector space with basis  are the coefficients of the basis vectors in the expression

See also
Correlation coefficient
Degree of a polynomial
Monic polynomial
Binomial coefficient

References

Further reading

Sabah Al-hadad and C.H. Scott (1979) College Algebra with Applications, page 42, Winthrop Publishers, Cambridge Massachusetts  .
Gordon Fuller, Walter L Wilson, Henry C Miller, (1982) College Algebra, 5th edition, page 24, Brooks/Cole Publishing, Monterey California  .

Polynomials
Mathematical terminology
Algebra
Numbers
Variables (mathematics)